The Chinese Bungalow is a 1926 British silent drama film directed by Sinclair Hill, and starring Matheson Lang, Genevieve Townsend and Juliette Compton. It was based on the 1925 play The Chinese Bungalow, which was adapted for further films in 1930 and 1940. It was made by Stoll Pictures, whose principal star throughout the mid-1920s was Lang.

Cast
 Matheson Lang as Yuan Sing
 Genevieve Townsend as Charlotte
 Juliette Compton as Sadie
 Shayle Gardner as Richard Marquess
 George Thirlwell as Harold Marquess
 Malcolm Tod as Vivian Dale
 Clifford McLaglen as Abdal
 George Butler as Chinese Servant
 Guy Mills as Chinese Servant

References

Bibliography
 Bamford, Kenton. Distorted Images: British National Identity and Film in the 1920s. I.B. Tauris, 1999.

External links

1926 films
1926 drama films
British silent feature films
Films directed by Sinclair Hill
Stoll Pictures films
British drama films
British black-and-white films
1920s English-language films
Silent drama films
1920s British films